All Saints and St Nicholas, South Elmham is a civil parish in the north of the English county of Suffolk. The parish is in the East Suffolk district and is one of the parishes that make up the area around Bungay known as The Saints. It includes the settlements of All Saints, South Elmham and St Nicholas, South Elmham.

The parish has a population of around 130. It borders the parishes of St Peter South Elmham, St Michael South Elmham, St Margaret South Elmham, St Cross South Elmham, St James South Elmham and Rumburgh. The parish council is operated jointly with St Peter and St Michael South Elmham.

History
The parish is believed to be part of the land given by Sigeberht of East Anglia, the ruler of the Anglo-Saxon Kingdom of East Anglia to Felix of Burgundy during the 7th-century. At the Domesday survey on 1086, both All Saints and St Nicholas were included as part of the area recorded as South Elmham in Wangford Hundred. A population of 108 households was recorded. By the early 12th-century, the land was held by the Bishop of Norwich, before being seized during the Dissolution of the Monasteries and transferred to Edward North, 1st Baron North in 1535.

By the late 16th century the Tasburgh family from the Flixton area had become dominant in the parish. The Adair family from Cratfield later became the main landowners. The two parishes of All Saints and St Nicholas were combined in 1737.

Culture and community

The parish church of All Saints survives, although it is formally redundant and cared for by the Churches Conservation Trust. It is a Grade I listed building, dates from the 12th-century and is one of around 40 round-tower churches in Suffolk. Other than the parish church, the village has no services.

The church of St Nicholas was in ruins by the 17th-century and by the early 20th-century only a cross survived marking the position of the building.

Notes

References

External links

Civil parishes in Suffolk
Waveney District